Scrambled Eggs is a 1976 French comedy film directed by Joël Santoni and starring Jean Carmet.

Cast
 Jean Carmet - Marcel Dutilleul
 Jean-Claude Brialy - Brumaire
 Anna Karina - Clara Dutilleul
 Michael Lonsdale - Le Président de la République
 Michel Peyrelon - Le Ministre d'Agriculture
 Michel Aumont - Le Chef de cabinet de la Présidence
 Gabrielle Doulcet - La grand-mère
 Jean-Pierre Cassel - Le représentant du dirigeant italien
 Denise Bosc - La secrétaire d'Etat
 Christian de Tillière - Le chauffeur de Brumaire
 Lionel Vitrant - Le livreur de glaces
 Claude Legros - Le concierge de l'Elysée
 André Penvern
 Albert Michel
 Jean-Pierre Coffe - Le maire

References

External links
 

1976 films
French comedy films
1970s French-language films
1976 comedy films
Films directed by Joël Santoni
1970s French films